The Checheng Fu'an Temple is a temple in Checheng Township, Pingtung County, Taiwan.

History
The temple was originally built as the Jinsheng Pavilion in 1662 to worship Tudigong during the Qing Dynasty under Kangxi Emperor to accommodate migrant people from Quanzhou in Checheng. It was later renamed as Fu'an Shrine after funds were raised and the pavilion was renovated during the Jiaqing Emperor. In 1953, it was officially renamed as Checheng Fu'an Temple.

Architecture
The temple was built with Northern China royal temple style. It is the largest temple in Taiwan that is dedicated to Tudigong.

See also
 Chaolin Temple
 Donglong Temple
 Three Mountains King Temple
 List of temples in Taiwan
 List of tourist attractions in Taiwan

References

1662 establishments in Taiwan
Religious buildings and structures completed in 1662
Taoist temples in Taiwan
Temples in Pingtung County